Tahani Al-Jamil may refer to:

 Tahani Al-Jamil (The Good Place character)
 "Tahani Al-Jamil" (The Good Place episode)